Laurent Couraire-Delage (born 24 June 1958) is a French sailor. He competed at the 1984 Summer Olympics and the 1988 Summer Olympics.

References

External links
 

1958 births
Living people
French male sailors (sport)
Olympic sailors of France
Sailors at the 1984 Summer Olympics – Flying Dutchman
Sailors at the 1988 Summer Olympics – Flying Dutchman
Sportspeople from Paris
20th-century French people